PV may refer to:

Places
 Paceville, Malta
 Puerto Vallarta, Mexico
 Postal village, a settlement that has a post office

United States
 Palos Verdes Peninsula, California
 Prescott Valley, Arizona
 Prairie Village, Kansas

Politics
 Partido Verde (disambiguation), several political parties
 Peoples Voice, a political party in Singapore
 Preferential voting (disambiguation), a category of electoral systems

Science and technology
 Photovoltaics, a technology for converting sunlight into electricity
 Potential vorticity, in fluid dynamics 
 Presta valve, one of the two common tire valves
 Process variable, in control systems
 Programmed visibility, of traffic signals

Biology and medicine
 Parvalbumin, a calcium-binding albumin protein
 Pathovar, a bacterial strain or set of strains with the same or similar characteristics
 Pemphigus vulgaris, a chronic blistering skin disease
 Per vaginam, through/via the vagina
 Periventricular nucleus, of the hypothalamus
 Pharmacovigilance, a science of pharmaceutical products
 Poliovirus, the causative agent of polio
 Polycythemia vera, a condition in which there is an increase in the number of red blood cells in the body
 Pyrovalerone, a stimulant drug

Chemistry
 Pressure and volume, for example in the ideal gas equation (PV=nRT)
 Protecting group, as Pv, Pivaloyl
 Peroxide value
 Perovskite (Pv), a mineral

Computing
 Page view, a metric in web analytics
 Semaphore (programming), from P and V operations in semaphores restricting processes in a shared environment
 Paravirtualization, a technique for the virtualization of guest operating systems in virtual machines

Mathematics
 Principal value, a single-valued function in complex analysis
 Principal variation, the sequence of moves in a game tree currently believed to represent best play; see Variation (game tree)
 Cauchy principal value, a method for assigning values to certain improper integrals which would otherwise be undefined
 Pisot–Vijayaraghavan number (PV-number), a real algebraic integer

Transportation
 Pallavaram railway station, Chennai, Tamil Nadu, India (Southern Railway station code)
 Pasažieru vilciens, a Latvian passenger-carrying railway company
 PV-1 Ventura, a World War II-era bomber and patrol aircraft
 PAN Air (IATA airline designator)
 Volvo PV, an automobile

Other uses
 Personal vaporizer or electronic cigarette
 P. V. Narasimha Rao (1921–2004), former Prime Minister of India, known as PV
 Point of view (literature)
 Port Vale F.C., an English football club
 Powerviolence, a subgenre of hardcore punk music
 Prairie Vista Elementary School, Indiana, US
 Present value, of money
 Promotional video (disambiguation)

See also
 Methylenedioxypyrovalerone (MDPV), a chemical
 alpha-Pyrrolidinopentiophenone (a-PVP), a chemical
 Pee Vee (disambiguation)
 Peavey (disambiguation)